Hardegsen is a railway station located in Hardegsen, Germany. The station is located on the Sollingbahn, and the train services are operated by Deutsche Bahn.

Train services
The station is served by the following services:

Local services  Bodenfelde – Northeim

References

Railway stations in Lower Saxony